Vranovci is a village in the municipality of Vrapčište, North Macedonia.

Demographics
As of the 2021 census, Vranovci had 312 residents with the following ethnic composition:
Albanians 303
Persons for whom data are taken from administrative sources 9

According to the 2002 census, the village had a total of 480 inhabitants. Ethnic groups in the village include:

Albanians 477
Turks 2
Others 1

References

External links

Villages in Vrapčište Municipality
Albanian communities in North Macedonia